The 1968 RAC British Sports Car Championship was the fifth season of the British Sports Car Championship.

The championship was won by Bill Bradley driving a Porsche Carrera 6.

Results
Races shown in bold were also rounds of the 1968 International Championship for Makes.

References

British Sports Car Championship
Sports Car